Mattias Jonas Bäckman (born October 3, 1992) is a Swedish professional ice hockey defenceman. Bäckman was drafted 145th overall by the Detroit Red Wings in the 2011 NHL Entry Draft.

Playing career

Swedish Hockey League
During the 2008–09 season, Bäckman debuted in Sweden’s SuperElit junior league with the Linköpings' J20 club, appearing in a pair of games without registering a point.

During the 2009–10 season, Bäckman spent the majority of the season with Linköpings J20, recording four goals and assists in 33 games in the regular season before adding one goal in six games in the playoffs. Bäckman also played in 5 contests with the big club in the Elitserien without registering a point.

During the 2010–11 season, Bäckman appeared in six Elitserien games with Linköpings and two games on loan to First Division team Mjolby. Bäckman scored one goal and two assists for Mjolby. Bäckman recorded two goals and 18 assists in 27 games with Linkopings U20 team and added 2 assists in three playoff games.

During the 2011–12 season, Bäckman skated in 42 games for Linköpings as a 19-year-old in his first professional season in Sweden's Elitserien. Bäckman recorded one goal and seven assists. Backman skated with Linkopings U20 team in six regular season games and was plus-two with one goal and one assist. Bäckman was with the U20 team during the run to the SuperElit finals after Linkopings' tenth-place men's team did not make the playoffs and was the team's second-leading scorer with two goals and six assists in six games.

During the 2012–13 season, Bäckman appeared in 52 games in his second season with Linköpings, where he recorded two goals and 24 assists. Linköpings finished fifth in the Elitserien and lost to league champion Skelleftea in the playoff semifinals. Backman recorded two goals and assists in 10 playoff games. Bäckman played five games for Sweden in the European Trophy tournament with no points nor penalty minutes.

During the 2013–14 season, Bäckman appeared in a career-high 54 games, where he recorded six goals and 15 assists during his third and final SEL season. During the playoffs, Bäckman helped Linköpings reach the semifinals, recording seven assists in 13 games.

North America
On May 21, 2013, Bäckman signed a three year entry-level contract with the Detroit Red Wings.

After Linköpings were eliminated from the playoffs, Bäckman was assigned to the Grand Rapids Griffins, and made his American Hockey League (AHL) debut on April 18, 2014, in a game against the Lake Erie Monsters. During the 2014 Calder Cup playoffs, Bäckman recorded one goal and five assists in 10 playoff games.

Bäckman began the 2014–15 season with the Griffins. In 18 games he recorded four assists. On December 26, 2014, the Griffins reassigned Bäckman to Linköpings HC. On March 1, 2015, the Detroit Red Wings traded Bäckman and Mattias Janmark-Nylén to the Dallas Stars in exchange for Erik Cole.

In the 2016–17 season, in his final year under contract with the Stars and stationed in the AHL with Texas, Bäckman appeared in 41 games with 11 points before he was loaned by the Stars to the Hershey Bears in exchange for Darren Dietz on March 8, 2017. He appeared in 5 games with the Bears before he was excluded from the post-season roster and left at the conclusion of the regular season. As expected he was not tendered a qualifying offer by the Stars at the conclusion of the season, releasing Bäckman to free agency.

Return to Europe
On June 30, 2017, Bäckman signed a one-year contract with EHC Kloten of the National League (NL). After completing the 2017–18 season with Kloten, Bäckman returned to Sweden agreeing to terms with Linköpings on a multi-year contract on April 27, 2018.

In the midst of the 2021–22 season, his fourth successive season blighted through injury with Linköping, Bäckman announced he was taking a hiatus from professional hockey in order to regain his health on 7 December 2021.

International play

Bäckman represented Sweden at the 2010 World Junior A Challenge. Bäckman recorded one assist and four penalty minutes for fifth-place Sweden at the WJAC. Bäckman later represented Sweden at the 2012 World Junior Ice Hockey Championships, where he won a gold medal. In six games at the WJC, Bäckman recorded three assists.

Career statistics

Regular season and playoffs

International

References

External links

1992 births
Living people
Detroit Red Wings draft picks
Grand Rapids Griffins players
Hershey Bears players
EHC Kloten players
Linköping HC players
Sportspeople from Linköping
Swedish expatriate ice hockey players in the United States
Swedish ice hockey defencemen
Texas Stars players